IIB or IIb may refer to:

 IIb, a diamond type
 IIb, a type of type II supernova
 Intergranular and Interphase Boundaries (IIB) in Materials, a series of triennial international conferences which started in Paris (France) in 1989
 International Investment Bank, a multilateral development bank
 "Ice Ice Baby", a hip hop song written by American rapper Vanilla Ice
 International Patent Institute (Institut International des Brevets), an intellectual property organisation established on June 6, 1947, now defunct
 Islamic International Brigade, an international unit of Islamist mujahideen founded in 1998
 KBC Bank Ireland, (established in 1973 as Irish Intercontinental Bank), one of the leading non-retail banks in Ireland
 Type II string theory (type IIB), described by type IIB supergravity in ten dimensions
 IBM Integration Bus, an enterprise service bus software product by IBM
 A rating in the Hong Kong motion picture rating system

See also 
 2B (disambiguation), including a list of topics named II-B, etc.